Red Brigade Trust is a non-governmental organization located in Lucknow, Uttar Pradesh, India. It was formed in 2011 by Ajay Patel focuses on empowering women through self-defense education.

About

In 2010, while conducting a workshop with teenage girls, Ajay Patel and his team discovered that most of the participants were sexually assaulted in their own houses by their own family members or close relatives. Along with a group of 15 girls, most of them the victim of one or other form of sexual assault, they decided to fight back. Red Brigade Trust was formed by a group of survivors of sexual violence under the leadership of Ajay Patel. The group was officially registered as a trust in 2014 with Ajay Patel being the Managing Trustee.

Grant partner
FRIDA The Young Feminist Fund is the grant partner for Red Brigade since 2014.

What is FRIDA

References

Women in India
Self-defense